The Embassy of the Philippines in Ottawa is the diplomatic mission of the Republic of the Philippines to Canada. Opened in 1971, it is currently located at 30 Murray Street in the ByWard Market neighborhood of central Ottawa, roughly between the U.S. and Danish embassies.

History
The Philippine Embassy in Ottawa was opened on March 1, 1971, with Privado G. Jimenez becoming the first resident Philippine ambassador to Canada. Notably, the Embassy is not the first Philippine diplomatic mission in Canada; the Philippine Consulate General in Vancouver is older, dating back to 1956.

Several Filipino diplomats posted to Canada were recalled in May 2019 by Foreign Affairs Secretary Teodoro Locsin Jr., ostensibly to pressure the Canadian government to take action in resolving the Canada–Philippines waste dispute, where several garbage-laden shipping containers were shipped to the Philippines from Canada and had been a sticking point in relations between the two countries for a number of years. The dispute was finally resolved around two weeks later with Canada taking back the containers, and the diplomats were promptly dispatched back to Canada by the DFA to resume their posts.

Chancery
Since July 1, 2016, the Philippine Embassy in Ottawa has been based out of a standalone building at 30 Murray Street, relocating from its previous chancery in the Varette Building at 130 Albert Street in downtown Ottawa, which it had moved into in 2011. The property, previously called the Collectiv Building, was acquired by the Philippine government for this purpose on January 15, 2016.

The consular section is located on the first floor, while the ambassador's office is located on the second floor. The third floor houses event space for the mission's activities, as well as the Ottawa center of the Sentro Rizal — the first in Canada — which opened on May 10, 2018.

Staff and activities
The Philippine Embassy in Ottawa is provisionally headed by a chargé d'affaires, pending the appointment of a new ambassador by the Philippine government. The current chargé d'affaires is Jeffrey P. Salik, while the last resident ambassador was Rodolfo D. Robles, who was appointed to the position by President Rodrigo Duterte on February 24, 2020. Prior to becoming Ambassador, Robles, a lawyer, was the Permanent Representative of the Philippines to the United Nations. His appointment was confirmed by the Commission on Appointments on March 4, 2020, and he presented her credentials to Governor General Julie Payette on November 30, 2020, in a ceremony that was held virtually due to the COVID-19 pandemic in Canada.

Notable diplomats deployed to the Embassy include Francisco Noel Fernandez, who topped the 1994 Philippine Bar Examination and was appointed as its Deputy Chief of Mission in September 2016, and Buenaflor Cruz, who while serving at the Embassy was charged in 2014 with human trafficking involving the exploitation of a 26-year-old Filipino woman who was hired as a nanny.

Serving nearly a million Filipino Canadians, many of the Embassy's activities center around fostering continuing relations between Filipinos in Canada and their home country. In 2014, it organized the first annual Winter Escapade, where Filipino Canadians are brought to the Philippines for a week-long tour of the country during the winter months. Organized in cooperation with the other Philippine diplomatic missions in Canada, as well as other government agencies, the first tour generated over C$1 million in economic output, with 60-65 percent of participants taking the trip more than once. It also organizes events in cooperation with the local Filipino community, such as an annual series of Christmas events and contests, and cultural exhibits at the Sentro Rizal.

The Embassy exercises consular jurisdiction over eastern Ontario, Quebec and Atlantic Canada, where it services nearly 53,000 Filipinos, more than half of whom are in Quebec.

See also
Canada–Philippines relations
List of diplomatic missions of the Philippines
Filipino Canadians

References

External links
Official website of the Philippine Embassy in Ottawa

P
O
Canada–Philippines relations